Economy in Kurdistan Region consists of the autonomous economy in Kurdistan region in northern Iraq. The Kurdistan region's economy is dominated by the oil industry, agriculture and tourism. Since late 2016, the standard of living in Kurdistan Region has been lower than the rest of Iraq.

History

1992–2003
In Kurdistan been semi-autonomous since the 1990 Gulf War and subsequent protection of the region from the hostile forces of the Hussein regime forces by the Allied establishment of a no fly zone.
 
Prior to the removal of Saddam Hussein, the Kurdistan Regional Government received approximately 14% of the revenues from the UN's Oil-for-Food Program. By the time of the US invasion of Iraq in 2003, the program had disbursed $8.35 billion to the KRG. Iraqi Kurdistan's relative food security allowed for substantially more of the funds to be spent on development projects than in the rest of Iraq. By the program's end in 2003 $4 billion of the KRG's oil-for-food funds remained unspent. Between 1992 and 2003, the GDP growth rate was between 6% and 10%.

During US occupation of Iraq (2003–2011)
Following the removal of Saddam Hussein's administration and the subsequent violence, the three provinces fully under the Kurdistan Regional Government's control were the only three in Iraq to be ranked "secure" by the US government. According to the KRG website, not a single coalition soldier has died nor a single foreigner been kidnapped since the 2003 invasion of Iraq in areas administered by the KRG.

The relative security and stability of the region has allowed the KRG to sign a number of investment contracts with foreign companies. In 2006, the first new oil well since the invasion of Iraq was drilled in the Kurdistan region by the Norwegian energy company DNO. Initial indications are that the oil field contains at least  of oil and will be pumping  by early 2007. The KRG has signed exploration agreements with several other oil companies, including Canada's Western Oil Sands and the UK's Sterling Energy and Gulf Keystone Petroleum.

The stability of the Kurdistan region has allowed it to achieve a higher level of development than other regions in Iraq. In 2004, the per capita income was 50% higher than in the rest of Iraq. By 2009, this was 200% higher. The highest growth rates achieved was around 12.7% in 2005–2008 and again 11.5% in 2010–2012. Since 2012, the growth rate has stabilized between 7% and 8%. The government continues to receive a portion of the revenue from Iraq's oil exports, and the government will soon implement a unified foreign investment law.

The KRG also has plans to build a media city in Arbil and free trade zones near the borders with Turkey and Iran by 2016. The KRG is an integral part of the general cultural and economic region also containing Syria, Turkey, Lebanon, Israel, Cyprus, Armenia, Azerbaijan, Iran, Georgia, Greece, Bulgaria, Romania, and Moldova, i.e. the Eastern Mediterranean-Black Sea-Caucasian region. As such, the KRG leadership has expressed plans for a more thorough integration and relationship with these countries, especially the three Caucasian Republics, Turkey, and Moldova. This would give the Kurdish economy a better bridge-head or foothold into Russia, Europe and the EU. According to President Barzani, this would also cement KRG's essentially Eurasian character rather than an undesirable Middle Eastern-Arab character. According to Barzani, the Kurdish culture, national characteristics, work ethics, business culture, etc. are more similar to that of Georgia, Moldova, etc. than to that of the rest of Iraq. It also has a similar Eastern Mediterranean climate, cuisine and thus a favourable tourist destination.

Special Economic zones

The KRG currently has four SEZs , in Dohuk, Batifa, Shaqlawa and Chamchamal. The first SEZ was set up in 1999 in Batifa, and the last in 2011 in Shaqlawa. The SEZs are mainly for manufacturing of hydrocarbons, pharmaceuticals , packaged food and processed food. These include the largest bottling plant for Coca-Cola in the Middle East outside of Egypt, Israel and the GCC; and the largest production center for ice cream in Iraq and Syria combined. The Chamchammal SEZ is dedicated solely for the petroleum and natural gas sector. Further two more SEZs, in Amedi and Bazian, have been planned to be completed before 2016. SEZs together account for nearly 30% of all industrial jobs and 40% of all industrial revenue and output.

2011–present
Despite objections from Baghdad, the Erbil governate says the KRG has signed contracts with 42 oil companies from 17 countries with more favourable terms than those offered by Iraq’s central government. As recently as 2014 KRG officials claimed to sell 200,000 bpd and optimistically predicted exports of 1 million barrels annually.  
The Kurdistan Regional Government begun exporting crude oil by truck to Turkey during the summer of 2012. In 2013, the Kurdistan Regional Government completed a pipeline from the Taq Taq field through Khurmala and Dahuk to Faysh Khabur on the Turkey-Iraq border, where it is connected to the Kirkuk-Ceyhan pipeline. It allows the export of oil from the Taq Taq and Tawke oil fields. On 23 May 2014, the Kurdistan Regional Government announced that the first oil transported via the new pipeline was loaded into tanker at Ceyhan.

Financial crisis
The Kurdistan region was hit by an economic crisis in 2015. Despite an increase in overall production, oil revenues have decreased significantly since 2014 due to lower oil prices, disputes with the central government and the rapid expansion of the Islamic State. In June 2015, Exxon Mobil, the largest exporter by volume, evacuated its staff and left its facilities in the care of  peshmerga. In early December 2015, Peshmerga reportedly repelled an IS attack on those facilities, though the prospect of such attacks poses a deterrent to foreign investment. 17% of the central government's budget is earmarked for distribution to the KRG, but no funds have been disbursed since February 2014. A US-mediated agreement in 2014 would have resolved the conflict between the oil ministries of the KRG and the GOI, but this too collapsed over allegations of under payment. Erbil's independent contracts sold for less than market price due to its poor quality.

Wealth
Currently, most industrial supplies from Kurdistan are being supplied from abroad, trade with kurdistan region is a large part of the economy and trade of the frontier.

See also
Economy of the Middle East

References

Kurdistan Region (Iraq)
Economy of the Middle East
Economy of Kurdistan Region (Iraq)